The Mount Juliet Hotel & Golf Course is situated in Mount Juliet Estate Thomastown, County Kilkenny, Ireland.

History 
It was purchased in 1987 by the Killeen Group, who proceeded to develop the estate, incorporating a hotel, stud, golf course and residential properties. In 2002, a deal was signed that saw the hotel, spa and stud join the Conrad Hotels brand operated by Hilton Hotels Corporation. That arrangement was terminated late in 2009. In 2014, the estate was purchased by the Tetrarch group. The hotel also has a Michelin starred restaurant, the Lady Helen.

Golf
The par 72,  Jack Nicklaus designed golf course opened in 1991. It was voted the Best Parkland Golf Course in Ireland by Backspin Golf Magazine in 2008 and 2010. Other facilities at Mount Juliet include a driving range, practice putting greens and a golf academy.

Mount Juliet was the venue for the 2002 and 2004 WGC-American Express Championship, and hosted the European Tour's Irish Open on three occasions between 1993 and 1995. The event is scheduled to return in 2022. The course was also visited by Shell's Wonderful World of Golf in 1997, for a challenge match between Tom Watson and Fred Couples.

References

External links
Mount Juliet Estate, Kilkenny

Golf clubs and courses in the Republic of Ireland
Golf in Leinster
Sports venues in County Kilkenny
Irish Open (golf) venues